This is a list of launches made by the Long March rocket family between 1990 and 1999.

Launch statistics

Rocket configurations

Launch outcomes

Launch history

1990

|}

1991

|}

1992

|}

1993

|}

1994

|}

1995

|}

1996

|}

1997

|}

1998

|}

1999

|}

References

Sources 

 
 
 

Space program of the People's Republic of China
Long March